Cambridge City Council is a district council in the county of Cambridgeshire, which governs the City of Cambridge.

History

Cambridge was granted a Royal Charter by King John in 1207, which permitted the appointment of a mayor. The first recorded mayor, Harvey FitzEustace, did not serve until 1213. Cambridge was granted its city charter in 1951 in recognition of its history, administrative importance, and economic success. There are a number of ceremonial items used by the Council which date to different periods of history.

Activities
The council provides various facilities and services within the city. These include parks and open spaces, waste collection, council housing and local planning.

The Council also organises numerous events throughout the year, including the Cambridge Folk Festival and a programme of free summer entertainment entitled Summer in the City.
Its base is the Cambridge Guildhall, on the south side of Market Square in the centre of Cambridge.

Councillors

For electoral purposes, the city is divided into 14 wards: Abbey, Arbury, Castle, Cherry Hinton, Coleridge, East Chesterton, King's Hedges, Market, Newnham, Petersfield, Queen Edith's, Romsey, Trumpington, and West Chesterton.
There are 42 city councillors with three elected in each ward.

A new mayor and deputy mayor are elected every May, by the full council at its annual meeting. The mayor for 2022-2023 is Mark Ashton. The mayor's duties are almost entirely ceremonial, although the mayor chairs meetings of the full council.

The leader of the council is Anna Smith (Labour), and the deputy leader is Alex Collis (Labour).

The official opposition is Liberal Democrat, with Tim Bick leading that group and Cheney Payne being deputy leader.

The highest non-elected official is the chief executive. Robert Pollock took up the post in 2021.

Elections for a third of the seats take place three out of every four years. Cambridgeshire County Council elections take place in the 4th year. Due to boundary changes there was an "all up" (all Councillors are up for election) election in 2021, on the same day as other local elections.

See also
 Cambridgeshire County Council
 List of mayors of Cambridge

Notes

References
 Cambridge City Council
 Cambridge Mayor's Office
 Cambridge City Election Results since 1945

External links
Open data about Cambridge City Council on OpenlyLocal
Cambridge City Council YouTube channel

City Council
City Council
Non-metropolitan district councils of England
Billing authorities in England
Local authorities in Cambridgeshire